Kimbundu, a Bantu language which has sometimes been called Mbundu 

or 'North Mbundu'  (see Umbundu), is the second-most-widely-spoken Bantu language in Angola. 

Its speakers are concentrated in the north-west of the country, notably in the Luanda, Bengo, Malanje and the Cuanza Norte provinces. It is spoken by the Ambundu.

Phonology

Consonants 

Allophones:

[ɸ] and [β] are allophones of /p/ and /b/, respectively, before /a/ and /u/. The phoneme /l/ is phonetically a flap [ɾ], a voiced plosive [d] or its palatalized version [dʲ] when before the front high vowel /i/. In the same way, the alveolars /s/, /z/ and /n/ are palatalized to [ʃ], [ʒ] and [ɲ], respectively, before [i]. There may be an epenthesis of [g] after /ŋ/ in word medial positions, thus creating a phonetic cluster [ŋg] in a process of fortition.

There is long distance nasal harmony, in which /l/ is realized as [n] if the previous morphemes contain /m/ or /n/, but not prenasalized stops.

Vowels 

There are two contrasting tones: a high (á) and a low tone (à). There is also a downstep in cases of tonal sandhi.

Vowel harmony 
There is vowel harmony in two groups (the high vowels /i, u/ and the mid and low vowels /e, o, a/) that applies only for verbal morphology. In some morphemes, vowels may be consistently deleted to avoid a hiatus.

Loans

European Portuguese
There is a small number of words of Kimbundu  origin and many of those are indirect loans, borrowed via Angolan Portuguese.

The examples generally understood by most or all speakers of Angolan and European Portuguese include 

 ("very, a lot"), 

 ("old person") 





 ("money")



wi ("man, dude")

fixe ("cool"),
bué da fixe and muitá fixó ("excellent").

Conjugation 

Conjugating the verb to be (kuala; also kukala in Kimbundu) in the present:

Conjugating the verb to have (kuala ni; also kukala ni in Kimbundu) in the present :

References

External links
 The art of the language of Angola, author Father Pedro Dias, published in 1697
 Emuseum article on Kimbundu
 PanAfrican L10n page on Kimbundu
 Kimbundu people
 Ethnic groups of Angola

 
Kimbundu languages
Languages of Angola